Softlab GmbH was a software development and information technology consulting company who developed and deployed a software application called Maestro I, which was the first integrated development environment in the history of computing. Founded in Munich, Germany, in 1971, Softlab became a part of the BMW Group in 1992. In 2008, BMW merged Softlab and some subsidiary companies of Softlab Group into a new company named Cirquent.

See also
Christiane Floyd

Notes

Companies based in Munich
Defunct companies of Germany
Software companies of Germany